The Cinema Audio Society Award for Outstanding Achievement in Sound Mixing for a Motion Picture – Documentary is an annual award given by the Cinema Audio Society to documentary motion picture sound mixers for their outstanding achievements in sound mixing. It has been awarded since 2017.

Winners and nominees

2010s

2020s

See also
 Academy Award for Best Sound
 BAFTA Award for Best Sound

References

External links
 Cinema Audio Society Official website

Outstanding Achievement in Sound Mixing for a Motion Picture - Live Action
Awards established in 1993